"re*PINK" was Bonnie Pink's first remix album released under the Warner Music Japan label on February 27, 2002.

Track listing
Just a Girl (Chamber Funk Remix) (from Just a Girl)
Sweet (Edwards Extended Vocal Mix) (from Just a Girl)
Reason (Season Dub) (from Let Go)
Sleeping Child (The Gyration of Virgin Microbes Mix) (from Let Go)
Take Me In (DJ Hasebe Remix) (from Just a Girl)
Communication (Atom Remix) (from Just a Girl)
Thinking of You (Rosary Redeem Mix) (from Just a Girl)
Fish (Cornelius Remix) (from Let Go)
 (from Blue Jam)

Bonnie Pink albums
2002 remix albums
Warner Music Group remix albums